WB38 may refer to the following stations formerly affiliated with The WB Television Network:

WNOL-TV in New Orleans, Louisiana, now affiliated with The CW Television Network
WTTA in Tampa St. Petersburg, now affiliated with MyNetworkTV
WOLF-TV and WSWB in Scranton, Pennsylvania, now affiliated with The CW Television Network